Corumbá was under the control of Paraguay since the beginning of 1865, in the first phase of the Paraguayan War. José Vieira Couto de Magalhães (the president of the province of Mato Grosso at that time) undertook an operation to retake Corumbá in 1867.

The Battle
At this point, Corumbá was protected by a small Paraguayan garrison of 300 soldiers, as the troops were diverted to other fronts.

After the preparations made in Cuiabá, the 1st Provisional Battalion of the Brazilian Army departed for Corumbá with 1,000 men, under the command of colonel , on May 15, 1867, in boats across the Cuiabá River. On June 12, troops land in a region close to the village about 25 kilometers away. At dawn on June 13, colonel Coelho set up camp and started his march to the city and as he approached he began preparations for the attack.

At fourteen the battle began with Brazilian troops attacking from different points, taking Paraguayans by surprise. The battle lasted until eighteen hours, with victory for the empire. Brazilian casualties totaled 36 among those killed and wounded. On the Paraguayan side there were about 150, most of them executed, including commander Hermónegones Cabral, shortly after the end of the fight.

This victory raised the morale of the population of Mato Grosso, and began a period of expulsion of the Paraguayan invaders, which took place in 1868.

References

Corumbá
Corumbá
Corumbá
Corumbá
History of Mato Grosso do Sul